Monte N. Redman is a director of Sterling Bancorp and the Tourette Association of America.

Career
In 1977, Redman graduated magna cum laude from New York Institute of Technology with a Bachelor of Science in accounting and began working for Astoria Bank.

In 1979, he was appointed assistant controller of the bank.

In 1985, he was appointed vice president and investment officer.

In 1989, he was appointed senior vice president, treasurer, and chief financial officer.

In 1997, he was appointed executive vice president.

In 2005, he was elected chairman of the Tourette Association of America.

In May 2011, Redman was honored by the Queens Botanical Garden.

In June 2011, Redman was appointed as a director, president, and chief executive officer of Astoria Financial Corporation, the holding company for Astoria Bank.

References

New York Institute of Technology alumni
Living people
1951 births